Crume Glacier is a tributary glacier,  long, flowing east to enter Ommanney Glacier near the north coast of Victoria Land, Antarctica. The geographical feature was first mapped by the United States Geological Survey from surveys and from U.S. Navy air photos, 1960–63, and named by the Advisory Committee on Antarctic Names for William R. Crume, AS1, U.S. Navy, Support Equipment Maintenance Supervisor with Squadron VX-6 at McMurdo Station, Hut Point Peninsula, Ross Island, during Operation Deep Freeze 1968. The glacier lies situated on the Pennell Coast, a portion of Antarctica lying between Cape Williams and Cape Adare.

See also
 List of glaciers in the Antarctic
 Glaciology

References 

Glaciers of Pennell Coast